The Daring Swimmer is a 1934 German comedy film directed by Georg Jacoby and starring Ralph Arthur Roberts, Susi Lanner, and Ida Wüst.

Cast
Ralph Arthur Roberts as Otto Eberlein
Susi Lanner as Käthe
Ida Wüst as Gabriele Degenhardt
Elga Brink as Annemarie
Harald Paulsen as Fritz Neubauer
Erik Ode as Alfred Möbius
Hugo Fischer-Köppe as Wernicke
Gerhard Dammann
Anna Müller-Lincke
Gerti Ober
Else Reval
Willi Schaeffers

References

External links

Films of Nazi Germany
German comedy films
1934 comedy films
Films directed by Georg Jacoby
German films based on plays
Tobis Film films
German black-and-white films
1930s German films
1930s German-language films